Marta Eliana Isasi Barbieri (born 15 January 1966) is a Chilean politician who served as Deputy of the Republic of Chile.

External links
 BCN Profile

1966 births
Living people
Chilean people
Chilean people of Croatian descent
Chilean people of Italian descent
Regionalist Action Party of Chile politicians
Independent Democratic Union politicians
Independent Regionalist Party politicians